"Blueberry Hill" is a popular American song published in 1940, best remembered for its 1950s rock and roll version by Fats Domino. The music was written by Vincent Rose, the lyrics by Larry Stock and Al Lewis. It was recorded six times in 1940. Victor Records released the recording by the Sammy Kaye Orchestra with vocals by Tommy Ryan on May 31, 1940. Gene Krupa's version was issued on OKeh Records on June 3 and singer Mary Small recorded a vocal version on the same label with Nat Brandwynne's orchestra, released June 20, 1940.

Other 1940 recordings were by: the Glenn Miller Orchestra (The most famous version in the 1940s. Recorded in Chicago on May 13, 1940. Catalog number 10768A and by EMI on the His Master's Voice label as catalog numbers BD 5632 and MH 92) on Bluebird Records (10768), Kay Kyser, Russ Morgan, Gene Autry (also in the 1941 film The Singing Hill), Connee Boswell, and Jimmy Dorsey. The largest 1940 hit was by the Glenn Miller Orchestra, which reached #2 on the US charts. Dennis Day performed on radio comedy program The Jack Benny Program (November 10, 1940).

Louis Armstrong's 1949 recording charted in the Billboard Top 40, reaching number 29. It was an international hit in 1956 for Fats Domino and has become a rock and roll standard. It reached number two for three weeks on the Billboard Top 40 charts, becoming his biggest pop hit, and spent eight non-consecutive weeks at number one on the R&B Best Sellers chart. The version by Fats Domino was also ranked number 82 in Rolling Stone magazine's list of the 500 Greatest Songs of All Time.

In popular culture
 On the American television show, Happy Days, this was Richie Cunningham's favorite song.
 The song was used in the movie 12 Monkeys.
 Joe Edwards' restaurant Blueberry Hill, on the Delmar Loop in St. Louis, Missouri, where Chuck Berry frequently played, is named after the song.
 Prime Minister of Russia Vladimir Putin made a cover performance of the song on December 10, 2010 before an audience of international film and television celebrities, in support of a charity for ill children. Videos of his performance quickly went viral worldwide.
The song was featured prominently in the film The Eyes Of Tammy Faye.

References

1940 songs
1940 singles
1956 singles
1957 singles
Songs written by Larry Stock
Songs written by Al Lewis (lyricist)
Fats Domino songs
Gene Autry songs
Louis Armstrong songs
Grammy Hall of Fame Award recipients
United States National Recording Registry recordings
Imperial Records singles
Articles containing video clips
Songs written by Vincent Rose
Okeh Records singles